Hermanus Franciscus Carolus "Herman" van den Anker (July 14, 1832 in Rotterdam – July 9, 1883 in Paris) was a Dutch artist who painted in Pont-Aven, Brittany.

In 1854 he moved from his home town to Paris, and in 1868 moved to Pont-Aven, where he remained the rest of his life. He painted figures in national Breton dress. Together with Fernand Quignon, he painted the board which hung in the village above the entrance to the Pension Gloanec, designed to encourage artists to stay there.

References

1823 births
1883 deaths
Painters from Rotterdam
Pont-Aven painters
19th-century Dutch painters
Dutch male painters
19th-century Dutch male artists